Firevision was a Finnish electropop duo made up of Mikko Tamminen and Arttu Peljo. Prior to forming Firevision, Tamminen had already been in a band called Vaasalaiset Kansiot.

Firevision was established in 2002, and had its debut and sole album The Game You Play that was released the same year. The band enjoyed chart success with "Stars" and "Truth" both taken from the album. The duo split up in 2008 declaring they could possibly continue cooperating on various projects.

After break-up
The duo split each going to separate musical project. Mikko Tamminen renamed as Setä Tamu had a solo musical career as well as various projects including the duo with Kuningas Pähkinä called Kuningas Pähkinä & Setä Tamu and later the trio formation Yön Polte made up of Tamu, Pähkinä and Stig.

Discography

Albums

Singles

References

Finnish musical groups